is a light novel series, that has also been made into manga and anime series by Ryo Hoshino and illustrated by Ariko Ito. The anime series goes under the name . According to the New York Comic Convention, The Third has been licensed by Kadokawa Pictures U.S.A. and is distributed by Nozomi Entertainment for U.S. release. The anime was released in summer of 2007.

Plot
The series is set many years after a devastating war, which killed off 80% of the Earth's population. Earth is being watched by a group of beings known as The Third from a futuristic city called Hyperius. They are named after a red jewel-like eye on their forehead (Space Eye) that serves as a port for data access and other forms of communication. These beings are committed to protecting the humans from harm. One of the main ways to protect the humans is to control the amount of "technos" or technology that the humans have access to, known as the "technos taboo". Humans found using forbidden technos could be arrested and or killed by The Third's best "auto-enforcer" an AI robot named Bluebreaker.

It follows the adventures of Honoka, a 17-year-old-(15 years old in the manga) girl who is human, but was born with a third eye as well-(which is blue instead of red), which she keeps concealed with a red bandanna. The Third found that she could not interface with the rest of The Third and so declared her a mutation and left her with her human parents who then had her sent to live with her adoptive grandfather Walken-(who is not related by blood) and his caravan in order to give her a chance of a normal life. Her third eye enables her to see Chi and use it to find cloaked enemies and sense the emotions of all living things.

Honoka is a jack-of-all-trades who travels throughout the barren earth with the help of a sand tank operated by Bogie, an AI guardian given to her by her late grandfather. She earns a living by doing various jobs with the tank, like ridding areas of oversized spiders, ants, as well as other creatures, and escorting or transporting clients. One night while traveling through the desert, she comes upon a strange blonde-haired man named Iks (eeks). He arrived on the planet for a purpose which is not made clear to her or the viewers until the last episode. The Third is also nervous about his arrival and fears he may seek to harm the humans. In order to understand the world more, Iks contracts with Honoka to accompany her for most of her travels. During travel or at night, she recites poems by a writer named "Dona Myfree" (exact spelling unknown at this time).

Various other characters are woven in to bring out more of Honoka's character and virtues. She grows over the episodes into a person whose personality becomes critical to the very survival of the planet.

Characters

She is a jack-of-all-trades that will do any job except assassinate another human. Honoka wields a katana-(that once belonged to her late grandfather) and a pair of guns, which she uses for battles; since childhood, she has practically spent most of her life in the desert with her adoptive grandfather Walken who has also given her weapon training-(including sword fighting) at a very young age and taught her everything that she knows about the natural surroundings of the world around her. After Walken passed away sometime later, Honoka parted ways from Walken's caravan and started her journeys traveling with Bogie. Honoka is known as the  because of her graceful moves with her katana. She is also shown to be a gun fanatic, usually spending all of her money from her latest mission on guns and other weapons, much to Bogie's annoyance/chagrin.
Honoka also has a third eye similar to The Third, but this eye is blue rather than red and keeps it hidden with a red bandanna. She does not have the abilities that The Third have, but with the blue eye, she is able to detect life forces and sense other things in her environment. She is 17 years old in the anime and 15 in the manga (which appears to take place before the anime). She is incredibly strong, as by the end of the anime series she is able to take down a large army via utilizing her abilities to cause a cone of force that hurls multiple ton armored fighting vehicles, assumably in a similar weight class to modern MBTs, into the air. For reference, a modern MBT weighs around 60 tons, with tanks like the M1 Abrams weighing 68 tons.

He is the mysterious, seemingly young individual that Honoka meets early in the series. Iks has a calm and trusting persona, appearing to be harmless. However, he is sought after by The Third since no one knows his purpose or intentions. He has special powers of healing and is later revealed to be a visiting alien sent to observe the Earth. In the end it is revealed that he is the Arbitrator, who has come to make a decision about the Earth. He has also fallen in love with Honoka.

A robotic mind that acts a guardian, advisor and support for Honoka; he was appointed by Walken to guard and protect Honoka from any harm since she was a child, even serving as a parental figure towards her-(this shows his caring side for her) as there have been multiple times where he'll get concerned and worried for her safety and health. His actual unit is a metal oblong container with a green visor, which is where his intelligence is contained. Appears to be sentient to an extent and is often serviced at the hospital in Emporium. He will state Honoka's flaws bluntly, as well as reprimand her after spending all her money on guns, usually annoying her. He is a very skilled fighter, as he was able to defeat an anti-tank helicopter by himself. His name is a pun, as a bogie is a tank component. His armament consists of a large caliber cannon which has a very high rate of fire for such weapons, six machine guns in side emplacements, three on each side, in what appear to be simplified RWS mounts. As well, he has two dorsal rotary gun turrets that serve as CIWS guns. The machine guns fold away behind armor panels when not in use, and the main gun turret turns and is enclosed by armored panels that cover it when not in use. Bogie appears to be rather heavily armored. He survives autocannon fire without any visible damage, and continues to be operable even after detonation of ammunition by a penetrating hit dealt by an ATGM from an Anti Tank Attack helicopter. 

He is one of the best mechanics around and regularly services Honoka's sand tank; many years ago, his wife-(Millie's mother) was killed during a raid enforcing the technos taboo by the Inspection Force while which one of his customers in a panicked state started a shootout, leading a stray bullet to hit Zankan's wife and caused her death. He travels about with his young daughter Millie in a huge boxy armored crane, and is apparently an acquaintance of Honoka. He was killed by Blue Breaker because of repeatedly breaking the Technos Taboo near the beginning of the anime.

One of The Third and very interested in Honoka. He keeps tabs on her from time to time and wields considerable political power within The Third. He is later captured by Rona Fauna, and held prisoner.

Zankan's daughter who has been traveling with her widowed father and helps him run his mechanical business; when she was only a baby, her mother was killed during a shootout involving a customer and some soldiers from the Inspection Force, leading Zankan to raise Millie by himself. She is cheerful and likes Honoka as if she were her older sister, usually calling her Hono-chan. Currently, she is traveling with Honoka, Iks, and Bogie after her father was killed by a Blue Breaker for breaking techno taboo, thus leaving her an orphan. She now attends school in Emporium and lives with her father's sister Esmel, who has become her legal guardian. She has basic firearms training, and briefly possessed a handgun that was superficially similar to a Tokarev.

A youth that meets Honoka in the first episode and is a mechanic to the sand tank, Bogie, that Honoka owns, as well as a few others. He wishes to follow in the footsteps of "Pops" (Zankan). For this, he attends a technical school while working for Honoka's team. He has obvious feelings for Honoka, and usually gets jealous when she talks to Iks. Near the end of the anime, while trying to invent a way to improve Bogie, her tank, he breaks the Techno Taboo which causes him to be banned from being a mechanic.

A health teacher from Millie's school who takes an apparently sexual interest in Honoka. When she travelled with Honoka, she revealed that she can too can also sense chi. She also displays an open hatred towards men and carries a gun around with her. Despite her hatred of men, near the end of the anime she helps Iks with his feelings towards Honoka, later commenting after doing so "it's like a wife helping her husband find his mistress". Honoka often refers to her as Sensei, since she herself never went to school.

A cyborg from the Great War. He is a hunter out to merge with Allies of the Monster Troop to grow stronger. His body is made from a mysterious liquid metal and can shoot laser beams from his finger. In order to keep from deteriorating he forcibly assimilates other allies from the Monster Troop as well to keep his nanomachines stable. He is later killed by Honoka in a duel, where she disrupts his ability to regenerate.

Episodes

Further reading

References

External links
 Kadokawa's The Third website
 XEBEC's The Third website 

1999 Japanese novels
2006 Japanese television series endings
Anime and manga based on light novels
Fujimi Fantasia Bunko
Kadokawa Shoten manga
Kadokawa Dwango franchises
Light novels
Shōnen manga
Television shows based on light novels
Wowow original programming
Xebec (studio)